Machov is a market town in Náchod District in the Hradec Králové Region of the Czech Republic. It has about 1,100 inhabitants.

Administrative parts

Villages of Bělý, Machovská Lhota and Nízká Srbská are administrative parts of Machov.

Geography
It is located on the border with Poland. It lies in the Broumov Highlands. Machov, Machovská Lhota and Nízká Srbská lie in the valley of the Židovka brook. Bělý lies on the Třeslice brook, which flows into the Židovka in Nízká Srbská.

Machov entirely lies in the Broumovsko Protected Landscape Area. Near Machov, there are important resources of drinking water thanks to a geological substratum that filters rain water.

History
The first written mention of Machov is from 1354. It was probably founded during the colonization of this region in the 13th century. In 1465, it is first referred to as a market town. In 1545, it became a part of the large Náchod estate. The most significant owner of Machov was Ottavio Piccolomini, during whose cruel rule began the discontent of the population leading to a peasant uprising in 1775.

Demographics

Transport
There is the road border crossing with Poland Machovská Lhota / Ostra Góra.

Sights
The Church of Saint Wenceslaus was originally a wooden church from the 14th century with a separate bell tower from 1586. This church fell into disrepair and was replaced by the current Baroque building in 1675. On the square there is a Baroque Marian column from 1761.

A protected small-leaved lime) tree with estimated age of 500 years grows near the house No. 26.

In Nízká Srbská there is a preserved smithy from 1799. In Machovská Lhota there is a former evangelical rectory from 1813.

Twin towns – sister cities

Machov is twinned with:
 Radków, Poland

References

External links

 
Broumov Cliffs 

Market towns in the Czech Republic
Populated places in Náchod District